Balodyan  is a residential hostel project for nomadic and orphan children. This initiative was started in Jun 2009 at village Lat, in Kolhapur District, Maharashtra, India. Currently there are 31 children and planned to expand for 100 children.

This project is governed by Vidyarthi Vikas Prabodhini, a registered organization (Reg.No.MH/25713/KOP) working for improvement in rural education system in Kolhapur district of Maharashtra, India since last 5 years. Organization provides basic needs like computers, benches, library, laboratory and sports equipments, and audio-visual devices, Educational Adoption Program for economically challenged students in rural schools.

Ambassador Dnyaneshwar Mulay, Diplomat, Author, Columnist is the source of inspiration, guidance for project Balodyan.

References

External links
 Official website

Organizations for orphaned and abandoned children
Organizations established in 2009
Organisations based in Maharashtra
Educational organisations based in India
Child-related organisations in India
2009 establishments in Maharashtra